Acrocera is a genus of small-headed flies in the family Acroceridae.

Species
Subgenus Acrocera Meigen, 1803

Acrocera ashleyi Barraclough, 2000
Acrocera bacchulus (Frey, 1936)
Acrocera bakeri Coquillett, 1904
Acrocera bicolor Macquart, 1846
Acrocera borealis Zetterstedt, 1838
Acrocera bulla Westwood, 1848
Acrocera brasiliensis Gil Collado, 1928
Acrocera orbiculus (Fabricius, 1787)
Acrocera paitana (Séguy, 1956)
Acrocera convexa Cole, 1919
Acrocera fasciata Wiedemann, 1830
Acrocera flaveola Sabrosky, 1944
Acrocera fumipennis Westwood, 1848
Acrocera honorati Brèthes, 1925
Acrocera infurcata Brunetti, 1926
Acrocera laeta Gerstaecker, 1856
Acrocera londti Barraclough, 1984
Acrocera nigrina Westwood, 1848
Acrocera obsoleta Wulp, 1867
Acrocera pallidivena Schlinger, 1960
Acrocera parva Yang, Liu & Dong, 2016
Acrocera tenuistylus Yang, Liu & Dong, 2016
Acrocera turneri Schlinger, 1960
Acrocera unguiculata Westwood, 1848
Acrocera vansoni Schlinger, 1960
Acrocera wulingensis Yang, Liu & Dong, 2016

Subgenus Acrocerina Gil Collado, 1929:

Acrocera altaica Pleske, 1930
Acrocera arizonensis Cole, 1919
Acrocera bimaculata Loew, 1866
Acrocera braueri Pokorny, 1887
Acrocera bucharica Nartshuk, 1982
Acrocera cabrerae Frey, 1936
Acrocera chiiensis Ôuchi, 1942
Acrocera khamensis Pleske, 1930
Acrocera lindneri Sabrosky, 1954
Acrocera melanderi Cole, 1919
Acrocera melanogaster Schlinger, 1961
Acrocera mongolica Pleske, 1930
Acrocera natalensis Schlinger, 1960
Acrocera nigrofemorata Meigen, 1804
Acrocera obnubila Nartshuk, 1979
Acrocera obscura Gil Collado, 1929
Acrocera plebeia Brunetti, 1926
Acrocera prima Meijere, 1914
Acrocera rhodesiensis Schlinger, 1960
Acrocera sanguinea Meigen, 1804
Acrocera sordida Pleske, 1930
Acrocera stansburyi Johnson, 1923
Acrocera stelviana Pokorny, 1886
Acrocera subfasciata Westwood, 1848
Acrocera tarsalis Nartshuk, 1975
Acrocera transbaicalica Pleske, 1930
Acrocera trifasciata Pleske, 1930
Acrocera trigramma Loew, 1845
Acrocera trigrammoides Pokorny, 1887

The fossil species Acrocera hirsuta Scudder, 1877 is not considered an acrocerid, instead appearing closer to the Mythicomyiidae.

References

Acroceridae
Nemestrinoidea genera
Diptera of North America
Diptera of South America
Diptera of Asia
Diptera of Europe
Diptera of Africa
Taxa named by Johann Wilhelm Meigen